De Lesseps, Lesseps, or variation, may refer to:

People

Surnamed
 Alexandre de Lesseps (born 1949), French entrepreneur
 Barthélemy de Lesseps, (1766–1834), French diplomat and writer
 Bertrand Marie de Lesseps (1875–1918), French fencer
 Ferdinand de Lesseps (1805–1894), French diplomat and developer of the Suez Canal
 Ismaël de Lesseps (1871–1915), French fencer
 Jacques de Lesseps (1883–1927), French aviator
 Luann de Lesseps (née Nadeau; born May 17, 1965), American television personality, model, author, and singer
 Count Mathieu de Lesseps (1771—1832), French diplomat
 Mathieu Marie de Lesseps (1870–1953), French equestrian
 Victoria de Lesseps (born 1994), French-American painter

Given named
 deLesseps Story Morrison, Jr. (1944–1996; nicknamed "Toni"), American lawyer, business consultant, and politician
 deLesseps Story Morrison, Sr. (1912–1964; nicknamed "Chep"), American attorney, politician, and mayor of New Orleans, Louisiana

Nicknamed
 William Tolly (1715-1784), nicknamed "Ferdinand de Lesseps of Calcutta"

Fictional characters
 Frank DeLesseps, a fictional character from the 2009 Stephen King novel Under the Dome (novel)
 Hugo Lesseps, a character from Japanese light novel series Infinite Dendrogram
 Viola de Lesseps, the lead character in Shakespeare in Love

Places
 13641 de Lesseps, a minor planet named after French diplomat Jean-Baptiste Barthélemy de Lesseps
 De Lesseps Lake, a lake in Thunder Bay District, Northwestern Ontario, Canada
 De Lesseps River, a river in Thunder Bay District, Northwestern Ontario, Canada

Facilities and structures
 De Lesseps Lake Airport, Thunder Bay District, Ontario, Canada
 De Lesseps Field, a former airfield in Toronto, Ontario, Canada
 Fort De Lesseps, a former U.S. Army Coast Artillery Corps fort at Colón, Panama
 Plaça de Lesseps, Barcelona, Spain
 Lesseps station, Barcelona Metro, Barcelona, Spain

Other uses
 USS De Lesseps (1918), a World War I tug in the United States Navy
 Count of Lesseps, a French nobility title held by Mathieu de Lesseps
 Viscount of Lesseps, a French nobility title held by Ferdinand de Lesseps
 Lesseps affair (1888) bribery scandal involving Ferdinand de Lesseps

See also

 Lessepsian migration
 
 

 

fr:Lesseps